Fagara is a 2019 Hong Kong family drama film written and directed by Heiward Mak, adapted from Hong Kong chick lit writer Amy Cheung's novel ngo5 dik1 oi3 jyu4 ci2 maa4 laat6.The film is distributed by Media Asia Film and produced by Ann Hui and Julia Chu, starring Sammi Cheng, Megan Lai and Li Xiaofeng.

Plot 
After her father died, a Hong Kong girl discovers she has two hitherto unknown sisters, one in Taiwan and one in China. To settle her father's debt, she must reunite with them to run the family's hot pot restaurant. While the androgynous Taiwan sister is plagued by her toxic relationship with her mother, the fashionista sister from China is trying to fend off her grandmother's pressure to get married. Meanwhile, she is striving to unshackle herself from her ex-boyfriend in order to start a new relationship.

Cast 

 Sammi Cheng as Acacia, a travel agent
 Leung Wing as young Acacia
 Megan Lai as Branch, a professional pool player
 Li Xiaofeng as Cherry, a fashion vlogger
 Richie Jen as Choi Ho-san, an anaesthetist
 Kenny Bee as Ha Leung, owner of a hot pot restaurant
 Andy Lau as Kwok Tin-yan, Acacia's ex-boyfriend
 Liu Juei-chi as Chang Ya-ling, Branch's mother
 Wu Yanshu as Liu Fang, Cherry's grandmother
 Siuyea Lo as Radish, a worker at the hot pot restaurant
 Bryant Mak as Sweet Potato, a worker at the hot pot restaurant
 Kaki Sham as real-estate agent
 Ben Yuen as Brother Yung, funeral parlor agent
 Yeung Yi-yi as dish-washing grandmother
 Tam Tin-bo as cashier
 Lo Pei-an as Branch's father
 Sunjet Wang as Branch's brother
 Judy Hsu as Branch's sister
 Pipi Yao as Branch's fan
 Joman Chiang as Acacia's mother

Reception 
Critical reception for the film was mostly positive, with critics and audience praising Mak's storytelling and the performance of the cast, especially Cheng's. Edmund Lee of South China Morning Post gives the film a 4.5 out of 5 stars, calling it "an astonishingly assured return to form for director Heiward Mak, and already a front-runner for next year’s Hong Kong Film Awards".

The Hollywood Reporter's Elizabeth Kerr commends writer-director Mak for her work, writing: "It would all be treacly, weepy nonsense were Mak not to maintain a light touch, and, especially, if the three leads weren’t so engaging." Commenting on the performances of cast, Scott Marks of the San Diego Reader writes that Fagara "is a film told from a feminist point-of-view by three smart, strong, and self-reliant actresses who bring plausibility to their characters."

Richard Yu of The Cinema Escapist calls it a "touching family drama", but suggests that "the story and characters would have received a more in-depth treatment in the form of a multi-part television series instead of a two hour movie". Similarly, Richard Gray writing for The Reel Bits awards the film 4 out of 5 stars, calling it an "excellent character-based drama that never falls into the trap of sentimentality."

Awards and nominations

References

External links 

 Fagara at Rotten Tomatoes
 
 Fagara on Facebook

Hong Kong drama films
2010s Hong Kong films